Barbara Hall (born July 17, 1960) is an American television writer, producer, young adult novelist and singer-songwriter. She is known for creating and producing the legal drama Judging Amy (1999-2005) and the  fantasy family drama Joan of Arcadia (2003-2005) as well as the political drama Madam Secretary all for CBS.  She was a co-executive producer of the Showtime political thriller Homeland.

Biography
Hall was born in Chatham, Virginia, to Ervis and Flo Hall. Her older sister, Karen Hall, is also a television writer and producer. She graduated from Chatham High School in 1978, and summa cum laude from James Madison University with a Bachelor of Arts degree in English in 1982.

Shortly after graduating from university, Hall became a television writer and producer in Los Angeles, California, and worked on shows including Northern Exposure, Chicago Hope, ER, I'll Fly Away, Anything But Love and Moonlighting.  Then she created, wrote and produced the CBS legal drama Judging Amy (1999-2005) and the CBS fantasy family drama Joan of Arcadia (2003-2005). In 2013, she created, wrote and produced the CBS political drama Madam Secretary, which ran from September 21, 2014 to December 8, 2019.

Hall is also a founding member of the alternative country rock band The Enablers, with whom she released the albums The First Seven Songs (2003) and Come Back Soon (2004). In 2005, she released her debut solo album Handsome. Her second album, Bad Man, was released in 2013.

Filmography
Judging Amy (1999-2005) Creator, Writer, Producer
Joan of Arcadia (2003-2005) Creator, Writer, Producer
Army Wives (2008) Writer, Producer
Madam Secretary (2014-2019) Creator, Writer, Producer

Novels
Skeeball and the Secret of the Universe (1987)
Dixie Storms (1990)
Fool's Hill (1992)
A Better Place (1994)
House Across the Cove 1995)
Close to Home (1997)
A Summons to New Orleans (2000)
The Noah Confessions (2007)
The Music Teacher (2009)
Tempo Change (2009)
Charisma (2013)

Discography

The Enablers
The First Seven Songs (2003)
Come Back Soon (2004)

Solo
Handsome (2005)
Bad Man (2013)

Awards
Humanitas Prize for Television
Television Critics Association Award
TV Guide Award
Catholics in Media Award

References

External links

 Barbara Hall of Chatham, Virginia

1960 births
20th-century American novelists
21st-century American novelists
American television writers
American women novelists
James Madison University alumni
Living people
People from Chatham, Virginia
Novelists from Virginia
American women television writers
20th-century American women writers
21st-century American women writers
Showrunners
Singer-songwriters from Virginia
Screenwriters from Virginia
American women television producers